Ellie McKenzie (born 17 October 2002) is an Australian rules footballer playing for the Richmond Football Club in the AFL Women's (AFLW).

Early life and junior football
McKenzie grew up in the northern Melbourne suburb of Northcote. She first played junior football in 2010 in an under 10s boys team at the Fitzroy Junior Football Club before a representative stint with the Northern Knights in the NAB League Girls competition.

She earned All-Australian honours as a bottom age player at the 2019 AFL Women's Under 18 Championships but was unable to challenge for a consecutive honour after the 2020 series was cancelled due to the COVID-19 pandemic.

AFL Women's career
McKenzie was drafted by Richmond with the first overall pick in the 2020 AFL Women's draft.

She made her debut against  at Punt Road Oval in the opening round of the 2021 season. She recorded 12 disposals in the loss, and was named among her side's best by AFL Media.

McKenzie won a 2021 AFL Women's Rising Star nomination for her role in 's first ever AFLW win, recorded against . In that game, she had 16 disposals, 5 marks, a goal and 4 inside 50s. McKenzie won the league's best first year player award in 2021, following in the footsteps of Rising Star winner Chloe Molloy, Brownlow medallist Madison Prespakis and St Kilda gun Georgia Patrikios. She received 137 votes to win the award, the closest to her being Bulldog Jess Fitzgerald on 63 votes. She also finished runner up in the team's best and fairest for 2021, finishing with 15 vote which was 1 behind winner Monique Conti, and won the team's best first year player award.

Statistics
Statistics are correct to the end of the 2021 season.

|- style="background-color: #eaeaea"
! scope="row" style="text-align:center" | 2021
|style="text-align:center;"|
| 22 || 9 || 4 || 4 || 70 || 70 || 140 || 27 || 26 || 0.4 || 0.4 || 7.8 || 7.8 || 15.6 || 3.0 || 2.9 || 6
|- 
|- class="sortbottom"
! colspan=3| Career
! 9
! 4
! 4
! 70
! 70
! 140
! 27
! 26
! 0.4
! 0.4
! 7.8
! 7.8
! 15.6
! 3.0
! 2.9
! 6
|}

Personal life
McKenzie is the younger sister of former  men's rookie Tom McKenzie.

References

External links 

 

2002 births
Living people
Richmond Football Club (AFLW) players
Northern Knights players (NAB League Girls)
Australian rules footballers from Melbourne
People from Northcote, Victoria